is a railway station on Kintetsu Railway's Kyoto Line in Nara, Nara Prefecture, Japan.

Lines

Kintetsu Railway
Kyoto Line

Building
The station has 2 platforms and 2 tracks.

Around the station
Nara Velodrome

History

 1928 - The Station opens when Nara Electric Railway Momoyamagoryo-mae to Saidaji open
 1963 - NER merges with Kintetsu
 2007 - Starts using PiTaPa

Adjacent stations

References

External links
Website

Railway stations in Nara Prefecture
Railway stations in Japan opened in 1928